There are a number of religious organisations in Sanathan Dharma  across South India.

List
 
 ALLAYYAM (ALL WORLD AYYA VAIKUNDAR MINISTRY) SWAMYTHOPPU
Ayya Vaikundar Thirukkudumbam
 Vaikundar Anbar Sangam, Paraikkode
 Vaikundar Anbar Sangam, Punniyam
 Ayyavazhi Makkal Iyakkam
 Ayya Sivasiva Arahara movement
 Anbukkodimakkal Thirucchabai
 Akila Ayya Arakkattalai
 Tharmayuka Makkal Iyakkam
 Akilam Kalai-Ilakkiya Peravai
IASF (International Ayyavazhi Service Foundation)

References

http://ayyavaikundar.com/

Organizations
Ayyavazhi
Ayyavazhi
Ayyavazhi